Pedro Luis Jaro Reguero (born 22 February 1963) is a Spanish retired footballer who played as a goalkeeper.

Playing career
After emerging through local CDC Moscardó's youth ranks, Madrid-born Jaro started his professional career with Cádiz CF in the 1983–84 season, playing once in an eventual La Liga relegation. In 1988 he moved to neighbours CD Málaga, who were also relegated at the end of his second year.

Subsequently, Jaro spent four years at national powerhouse Real Madrid, where he could only appear in 23 league games, barred by legendary Francisco Buyo. In the 1994–95 campaign he helped Real Betis overachieve for a final third place in the top division, immediately after having promoted: he played all 38 matches and only conceded 25 goals, good enough for the Ricardo Zamora Trophy.

Coaching career
After two years at Atlético Madrid, playing second-fiddle to another Spanish international, José Francisco Molina, Jaro retired at 36 with 237 appearances in the top flight. He went on to serve as goalkeeping coach for Atlético, the Spain youth national team and Real Madrid, moving to the latter in 1995 and remaining there for over a decade; in the same capacity, he also worked under Juande Ramos at FC Dnipro Dnipropetrovsk and Málaga CF.

Honours
Real Madrid
Copa del Rey: 1992–93
Supercopa de España: 1990, 1993
Copa Iberoamericana: 1994

References

External links

Stats and bio at Cadistas1910 
Betisweb stats and bio 

1963 births
Living people
Spanish footballers
Footballers from Madrid
Association football goalkeepers
La Liga players
Segunda División players
Cádiz CF players
CD Málaga footballers
Real Madrid CF players
Real Betis players
Atlético Madrid footballers
Real Madrid CF non-playing staff
Spanish expatriate sportspeople in Ukraine